Da Istanbul ordine di uccidere or From Istanbul, Orders To Kill is a 1965 Italian Eurospy film co-written and directed by Carlo Ferrero. It was based on the 1960 novel The Devil's Executor  by Robert Nilsen.

Cast

External links
 

1965 films
1960s spy thriller films
1960s Italian-language films
Italian spy thriller films
Films based on novels
1960s Italian films